The 2005–06 Scottish Challenge Cup was the 15th season of the competition, competed for by all 30 members of the Scottish Football League. The defending champions were Falkirk, who defeated Ross County 2–1 in the 2004 final. Falkirk did not compete in the tournament after being promoted to the Scottish Premier League.

The final was played on 6 November 2005 and was won by St Mirren who defeated Hamilton Academical 2–1 in the final at Excelsior Stadium in Airdrie.

Schedule

First round
Airdrie United and Dumbarton received random byes into the second round

Source: ESPN Soccernet

Second round

Source: ESPN Soccernet

Quarter-finals

Semi-finals

Final

External links 
 ESPN Soccernet Scottish League Challenge Cup page 

Scottish Challenge Cup seasons
Challenge Cup